Philanthaxia is a genus of beetles in the family Buprestidae, containing the following species:

 Philanthaxia acuminata Bílý, 1993
 Philanthaxia acuticollis Bílý, 2001
 Philanthaxia aenea (Saunders, 1866)
 Philanthaxia akiyamai Bílý, 1993
 Philanthaxia andamana Kerremans, 1888
 Philanthaxia aureoviridis Saunders, 1867
 Philanthaxia auricollis Kerremans, 1912
 Philanthaxia azurea Bílý, 2004
 Philanthaxia binhensis Bílý, 1997
 Philanthaxia cavifrons Bílý, 2004
 Philanthaxia ceylonica Tôyama in Bílý, 1993
 Philanthaxia convexifrons Kurosawa, 1954
 Philanthaxia cumingii (Waterhouse, 1887)
 Philanthaxia cupricauda Kerremans, 1895
 Philanthaxia cupricollis Tôyama in Bílý, 1993
 Philanthaxia curta Deyrolle, 1864
 Philanthaxia cyanescens Fisher, 1922
 Philanthaxia dorsalis Waterhouse, 1887
 Philanthaxia frontalis Bílý, 1993
 Philanthaxia hirtifrons Bílý, 2004
 Philanthaxia immaculata (Haupt, 1956)
 Philanthaxia indica Bílý, 1993
 Philanthaxia iriei Kurosawa, 1985
 Philanthaxia iris Obenberger, 1938
 Philanthaxia jakli Bílý & Nakládal, 2011
 Philanthaxia jendeki Bílý, 2001
 Philanthaxia kinabaluana Bílý, 1993
 Philanthaxia kubani Bílý, 2001
 Philanthaxia kwai Bílý, 1997
 Philanthaxia laosensis Baudon, 1966
 Philanthaxia lata Kerremans, 1914
 Philanthaxia lumawigi Bílý, 1993
 Philanthaxia merocratoides Bílý, 2004
 Philanthaxia nelsoni Bílý, 0006
 Philanthaxia nigra Théry, 1911
 Philanthaxia ohmomoi Bílý, 1993
 Philanthaxia ovata Bílý, 1993
 Philanthaxia parafrontalis Bílý, 1997
 Philanthaxia planifrons Bílý, 2004
 Philanthaxia pseudoaenea Bílý & Nakládal, 2011
 Philanthaxia pseudocupricauda Bílý, 1993
 Philanthaxia pseudofrontalis Bílý, 2004
 Philanthaxia purpuriceps (Saunders, 1866)
 Philanthaxia reticulata Bílý, 1997
 Philanthaxia robusta Bílý, 2004
 Philanthaxia rolciki Bílý, 2001
 Philanthaxia romblonica Bílý, 1997
 Philanthaxia rufimarginata (Saunders, 1866)
 Philanthaxia sadahiroi Bílý, 2004
 Philanthaxia sarawakensis Bílý, 1993
 Philanthaxia sauteri Kerremans, 1913
 Philanthaxia similis Bílý, 2001
 Philanthaxia simonae Bílý, 1983
 Philanthaxia splendida van de Poll, 1892
 Philanthaxia sumatrensis Bílý, 1993
 Philanthaxia tassii Baudon, 1968
 Philanthaxia thailandica Bílý, 1993
 Philanthaxia tonkinea Bílý, 1993
 Philanthaxia transwallacea Bílý, 2001
 Philanthaxia tricolor Bílý, 1993
 Philanthaxia vietnamica Bílý, 1993
 Philanthaxia viridiaurea Bílý, 1993
 Philanthaxia viridifrons Kerremans, 1912

References

Buprestidae genera